Enna Satham Indha Neram is a 2014 Indian Tamil language comedy thriller film directed by Guru Ramesh and produced by A. V. Anoop. The film features quadruplets Adhiti, Aakrithi, Akshathy and Aapthi in the lead roles, with M. Raja, Nithin Sathya, N. Puralavan, Maanu and Malavika Wales also appearing in prominent roles. The film tells the story of quadruplets who lose their way inside a zoo where they came for an excursion. The zoo keeper (Nithin) rescues them after one whole day's effort. Enna Satham Indha Neram entered the Limca Book of Records for being the "first ever film in the world arena, to cast real life quadruplets – four children born of the same pregnancy – in the same plot."

Cast 
 Aditi, Aakriti, Akshiti and Aapti as the Quadruplets
Guru Ramesh considered his decision to include quadruplets in his script as "unrealistic". After he "started writing to friends and several groups where twins and triplets socialise on Facebook", he came to know of the quadruplets through a friend. The parents of the twins were initially sceptical towards their casting, but after Guru Ramesh narrated the script to them, they agreed.
 M. Raja as Raja, the father of the Quadruplets
On Raja's casting, Guru Ramesh said, "Despite being a celebrity director, he didn’t complain when I told him that he was not a full-fledged protagonist. He was fine with it. In fact, I would say there is no one protagonist in the film."
 Nithin Sathya as Kadhir, The Zoo Keeper
 N. Puralavan as Zoo Police Officer
 Malavika Wales as Meenakshi, a teacher for deaf and mute students.
To prepare for her role, she had to attend a workshop for learning sign languages.
 Maanu as the mother of the Quadruplets.
After Guru Ramesh narrated the script to her, she told him that she was not interested in acting in the film. He later took her and Singapore-based theatre actor Puravalan to meet actor Rajinikanth (both Maanu and Puralavan took care of Rajinikanth at Singapore when he was sick in 2011), and narrated the script to him. On Rajinikanth's suggestion, Maanu finally accepted to act in the film, although his only concern was whether she should play "a mother of four seven-year-olds", which was not an issue for Maanu.
Imman Annachi
Manobala
Sivasankar
 Swaminathan as Murugaraj, a Blue Cross Member
Vaiyapuri
Nisha Krishnan as a journalist

Production 
Enna Satham Indha Neram is the first film in Tamil cinema to feature quadruplets prominently. 95% of the film was shot at the Zoological Park in Hyderabad, making it the first film to be shot predominantly inside a zoological park. The film was also shot at Vandalur Zoo in Chennai, making the crew of Enna Satham Indha Neram the first to shoot there. Some portions were also shot at Thalakkonam falls. The crew thus entered the film in the Limca Book of Records under these credentials. Director M. Raja was signed to act as the father of the quadruplets, making his acting debut. He had shot for only six days. Enna Satham Intha Neram was also the comeback film for actress Maanu, who was last seen in Kaadhal Mannan (1998). Other supporting actors include debutants Malavika Wales and Puralavan, followed by Iman Annachi, Manobala, Shivashankar, Vaiyapuri and Lollusabha Swaminathan.

Critical reception 
M. Suganth of The Times of India rated it 1.5 out of 5 stars, saying "The only sensible beings in the film are the kids themselves, and they seem more than capable of taking care of themselves, despite their age and disabilities — when one of them falls in a pit, they rescue her all by themselves, intelligently signal their location with balloons, and even use the tab that they have to find their way out of the place. And, it is only for them that you even endure the film." Udhav Naig of The Hindu said, "Despite the emotional set-up — four hearing- and speech-impaired children have lost their way inside the zoo with a giant snake — it's a bummer, from start to finish." Behindwoods said, "The filmmaking aspects of the movie are below par, with only the shots from the snake’s point of view standing out for being a little innovative. The VFX work on the snake is amateurish but it isn’t fair to expect much on this front, from ESIN, considering the budget constraints. But, animal lovers would get to see some lovely shots of the zoo." and rated the film 1.5 out of 5 stars. Mythili Ramachandran of Gulf News wrote, "Completely lacking in conviction, Enna Satham Indha Neram makes a lot of noise but is a case of empty cans."

References

External links 

2010s Tamil-language films
2014 films
Films about siblings
Films set in forests
Films shot in Andhra Pradesh
Films shot in Tamil Nadu
Indian comedy thriller films
2010s comedy thriller films